Juan Gabriel en el Palacio de Bellas Artes is a live album released by Juan Gabriel from Palacio de Bellas Artes Mexico on December 20, 1990. This was his first live material and was nominated for Pop Album of the Year at the Lo Nuestro Awards of 1992.

Disc 1

Disc 2

Sales and certifications

References 

 

Juan Gabriel live albums
1990 live albums
Spanish-language live albums